Roshan Doug is a British writer and academic of Indian descent. He is a former Poet Laureate of Birmingham appointed in 2000. Since 2002 he has also been an INSET poet for the Poetry Society of Great Britain and a Fellow of the Royal Society of Arts.

In 2020 Doug founded a charity organisation, Perspective Education, that supports and trains teachers and educationalists to provide a creative curriculum and holistic approach to teaching, learning and child development.

Doug is a public speaker and critic for BBC London and The Times Educational Supplement.

Early life and career 
Roshan Doug was born in 1963 in Jalandhar, Punjab, India, and studied English at Lancaster, Lancashire. After graduation, he took an academic post in Greece, teaching English for the British Council. On his return to Britain in 1988, he was awarded the Cripps Hall Residential Tutorship at the University of Nottingham where he completed an MA in Modern English Literature.

After working in private schools in Athens for the British Council, FE colleges and universities in London and Oxford, Doug was appointed a Visiting Professor in English at Birmingham City University in 2003. He is a Fellow of the Royal Society of Arts. In 2015, after winning a bursary, Doug completed his Doctorate in Education (Learning and Learning Contexts) at the University of Birmingham and went on to publish a range of papers on English in education.

Literary career 
Doug's first book Delusions was published in 1995. The Socialist Review described him as "a fresh and intelligent new voice in Anglo-Asian poetry". He has been anthologised by Spouting Forth (1997), Staple (2000), and Bloodaxe in their "Out of Bounds" volume of poetry (2013).

Doug's book The English-knowing Men published in 1999 was nominated for the Forward Prize for the Best Collection of that year. In 2001 the Orange Studio commissioned a collection, No I am Not Prince Hamlet, integrating themes of home, familiarity and cultural identity. In 2003, Doug was commissioned by Birmingham City University to produce a series of short elegies to commemorate the anniversary of the terrorist attacks in New York. This formed a volume entitled The Delicate Falling of a God. He was shortlisted for the Asian Jewel Awards in the same year.

Doug's first collection of love poems, What Light is Light, was published by the University of Birmingham in 2012 and then "Mother India" the following year. Together with a commission from the Indian High Commission, it lead critics to conclude that his politics were shifting towards Hindu nationalism.

Doug has been commissioned by national and international organisations such as National Gallery London (1998), BBC Children in Need (2000), Birmingham Waterhall Gallery (2001), Martineau Place Birmingham (2001), Buckingham Palace for the Queen's 75th birthday (2001), The High Commission of India (2003), Adult Learners' Conference NEC Birmingham (2003), Embassy of the United States, London (2005), Graham Kershaw in 2005 and BBC Radio 4's Something Understood.

In 2016, Doug published a paper in the International Journal of Education & Literacy Studies: "BIC Government White Paper, Handwriting: Developing Pupils' Identity and Cognitive Skills".

Publications
As a columnist, Doug has written articles for publications such as The Guardian, The Times, The Independent, The Daily Telegraph, The Daily Mail, The Sunday Times, EasternEye and the BBC in-house magazine, Ariel. Doug has written a wide range of papers including "The Business of Poetry" for the North East Wales Institute of Higher Education for their conference "The Narrative Practitioner", to the prospective essay "Gandhi: a Punjabi perspective" for The London Review of Books, and "The British Schools' National Curriculum: English and the politics of teaching poetry from different cultures and traditions" for The Journal of Curriculum Studies.

Books

 Delusions, Charles Green Education (1995) 
 The English-knowing Men, Castle View Publications (1999) 
 No, I am Not Prince Hamlet, Orange Studio (2002) 
 The Delicate Falling of a God, UCE Press (2003) 
 Illusions, Delusions and Dirty Words, UCE Press (April 2004) 
 What Light is Light, Birmingham University (November 2011) 
 Kabhi Kabhie, Amazon/Kindle (February 2021)

BBC broadcasts 
Doug has written and presented many arts documentary features for BBC such as Infinite New Verses (recorded in China 2004), Pause for Thought (Radio 2), Something Understood, A Land of Ghosts, The Asian Single Parents (London 2006), A Land of Dreams and Goblins (India 2002), Cuba Libre (Havana 2006) and The English-knowing Men on the themes in Anglo-Asian Poetry (London, 2005). His BBC programme "The Good Father" broadcast in 2004, was nominated for the Sony Radio Awards.

References 

British writers
1963 births
Academics of Birmingham City University
Living people
Indian emigrants to the United Kingdom